Three Wise Guys is a 2005 Christmas television film.

In an update on the nativity of Jesus, a pregnant woman named Mary is helped in the desert by three mobsters.  The film stars Tom Arnold, Eddie McClintock, Judd Nelson, Jodi Lyn O'Keefe, Katey Sagal, and Nick Turturro.

Filming took place in Albuquerque, New Mexico.  Robert Iscove directed, with a story and screenplay by Damon Runyon and Lloyd Gold, respectively.  Christopher Lennertz composed the score, and Francis Kenny was the cinematographer.  At 87 minutes, the Lions Gate Television-produced film was released on the USA Network at 9p.m., December 8, 2005.

See also
 List of Christmas films

References

External links
 

2000s Christmas films
2005 films
2005 television films
American Christmas films
Christmas television films
films directed by Robert Iscove
films scored by Christopher Lennertz
films shot in New Mexico
Lionsgate films
USA Network original films